Daniel or Dan Murray may refer to:

Characters
 Dan Murray, a character from the 1996 Tom Clancy novel Executive Orders

Footballers
 Dan Murray (Gaelic footballer) (born 1934), Irish former Gaelic footballer
 Dan Murray (English footballer) (born 1982), English footballer
 Dan Murray (Australian footballer) (1912–1992), Australian footballer

Others
 Daniel Murray (bishop) (1768–1852), Roman Catholic Archbishop of Dublin
 Daniel Murray (mathematician) (1862–1934), Canadian mathematician
 Daniel Murray (politician) (1751–1832), judge and politician in New Brunswick
 Daniel Alexander Payne Murray (1852–1925), librarian, bibliographer, author, politician, and historian
 Dan Murray (baseball) (born 1973), former baseball pitcher
 Daniel Murray (rugby league), rugby league player